English heavy metal band Judas Priest have released 18 studio albums, 6 live albums, 14 compilation albums, 29 singles, 10 video albums, and 21 music videos. The band currently consists of bassist Ian Hill, drummer Scott Travis, singer Rob Halford, and guitarists Glenn Tipton and Richie Faulkner. After guitarist K. K. Downing's retirement from the band in 2011, bassist Ian Hill is the only remaining founding member. Judas Priest have sold over 50 million albums worldwide, with 12 million copies in the United States.

Albums

Studio albums

Live albums
This section contains albums that Judas Priest have recorded live.

Compilation albums

Singles
This section includes physical UK and US singles only, and additional charted songs in these markets.

Notes:

Videography

Video albums

Music videos

References

External links
Judas Priest's official website

Discography
Heavy metal group discographies
Discographies of British artists